Monochamus accri is a species of beetle in the family Cerambycidae. It was described by Dillon and Dillon in 1959, originally under the genus Laertochamus.

References

accri
Beetles described in 1959